The Ireland cricket team toured the United Arab Emirates in December 2017 to play three One Day Internationals (ODIs) against the Afghanistan cricket team. The matches were used as a warm-up for the 2018 Cricket World Cup Qualifier, which took place in Zimbabwe in March 2018. Ireland won the series 2–1.

Squads

Ahead of the series, Ed Joyce was ruled out of Ireland's squad with a knee injury, with John Anderson replacing him. Niall O'Brien initially returned home to Ireland for personal reasons and was replaced by Stuart Poynter, but he re-joined the squad prior to the series.

ODI series

1st ODI

2nd ODI

3rd ODI

References

External links
 Series home at ESPN Cricinfo

2017 in Afghan cricket
2017 in Irish cricket
International cricket competitions in 2017–18
International cricket tours of the United Arab Emirates
Afghan cricket tours of the United Arab Emirates 
Irish cricket tours of the United Arab Emirates